

History 
Namm Radio is the first Kannada online radio channel.  started by Pastime Production Private Limited. NammRadio was on trial for one month before its launch. Nammradio was launched by famous Hindustani musician Nagaraja Rao Havaldar along with Col Kaushik, N.R. Vishukumar Director of Department of Information and Public Relations (Karnataka) alongside Kannada actor Chetan Kumar. Avanidhar Havaldar Founder & CEO of NammRadio has taken it to 196 countries today with 6 million listeners.

Availability & Listenership 
NammRadio is available on Android app  iOS app, and recently on Amazon Alexa.

On 25 November 2016, NammRadio launched its Gulf stream in a function attended by Shiva Rajkumar and Doddarange Gowda at Qatar Doha. On 3 November 2018 NammRadio launched its Europe stream at United Kingdom London.

The plans to launch its 5th streaming service for Australia got delayed due to Corona Pandemic.

Programs 
The channel airs 24 hours of content every day. The shows are aired in Havyaлka, Tulu, Byari and Coorgi language.

References 

Internet radio in India
Kannada people
Internet broadcasting
Streaming